The Navy "E" Ribbon or Battle Efficiency Ribbon (informally the Battle "E" ribbon) was authorized on March 31, 1976, by Secretary of the Navy J. William Middendorf as a unit award for battle efficiency competition. The service ribbon replaced the "E" patch previously sewn on the right sleeve of the enlisted naval uniform   for rates/pay grades E-1 through E-6.

History 
The Navy "E" Ribbon was designed by AZ3 Cynthia L. Crider in 1973. Her design and recommendation were approved by the Secretary of the Navy after three years, and the ribbon was subsequently created by the Department of the Army, which has the final approval for the design and colors of all ribbons and medals in the U.S. military. Serving with Carrier Airborne Early Warning Squadron 88 (VAW-88), a Naval Air Reserve E-2 Hawkeye squadron at NAS North Island, CA, Petty Officer Crider designed the ribbon after her squadron won the "E" award for the second time in a row, but with the new uniform change could not wear anything on their uniforms to show they had been awarded the Navy "E" two consecutive times.

Award criteria 
The Navy "E" Ribbon denotes the wearer was on permanent duty aboard a U.S. Navy ship or in a unit that won a battle efficiency competition after July 1, 1974. United States Marine Corps members assigned as ship's company are eligible on the same basis as Navy personnel; Marine Corps (and other sister-Service) personnel assigned to embarked units, such as aircraft squadrons, battalion landing teams, and Marine Expeditionary Units (MEU) are not eligible to wear the ribbon.

The Navy "E" Ribbon does not have a corresponding medal, meaning that when in full dress uniform (when medals are worn), the ribbon is placed above the right breast pocket of the uniform instead of the left. However, when in standard uniform (no medals are worn), the ribbon is placed above the left breast pocket, along with all other citations and awards.

The United States Coast Guard's equivalent of the Navy "E" Ribbon is the Coast Guard "E" Ribbon.

Navy "E" device 

The first, second, and third award of the Navy "E" (Battle "E") are denoted by a silver  inch letter "E" device on the Navy "E" Ribbon for each award. When a sailor or Marine receives a fourth Navy "E" award, a silver wreathed letter "E" replaces the three "E" devices on the ribbon. The wreathed "E" effectively "closes out" the award ribbon — no further "E" devices are authorized for display to denote five or more awards of the Navy "E". Multiple "E" ribbon attachments are placed in a symmetrical, horizontal line in the center of the ribbon.

See also
Awards and decorations of the United States military
Army-Navy ‘E’ Award
Battle Effectiveness Award
Marksmanship Device
United States military award devices

Notes

References

Awards and decorations of the United States Navy
Awards and decorations of the United States Marine Corps
Awards established in 1976
Military ribbons of the United States